Nassarius conoidalis, common name the cone-shaped Nassa or the jewelled dog whelk, is a species of sea snail, a marine gastropod mollusc in the family Nassariidae, the nassa mud snails.

List of synonyms
 Buccinum clathratum Wood, 1825 (invalid: junior homonym of Buccinum clathratum Born, 1778)
 Buccinum conoidale Deshayes in Belanger, 1832  (original combination)
 Buccinum gemmulatum Lamarck, 1822  (invalid: junior homonym of Buccinum gemmulatum Wood, 1818)
 Desmoulea ringens A. Adams, 1855
 Nassa (Niotha) gemmulata (Lamarck, 1822)
 Nassa (Niotha) gemmulata var. variegata A. Adams, 1852
 † Nassa (Niotha) rajaensis K. Martin, 1895
 Nassa clathrata Lamarck, 1816 (invalid: junior secondary homonym of Buccinum clathratum Born, 1778)
 Nassa cumingii A. Adams, 1852
 Nassa gemmulata (Lamarck, 1822)
 Nassa ringens Reeve, 1854  (invalid: junior homonym of Nassa ringens Michelotti, 1847)
 Nassa variegata A. Adams, 1852
 Nassa verrucosa A. Adams, 1852 (invalid: junior secondary homonym of Buccinum verrucosum Bruguière, 1789)
 Nassarius (Niotha) clathratus (Lamarck, 1822)
 Nassarius (Niotha) conoidalis (Deshayes in Belanger, 1832) accepted, alternate representation
 Nassarius (Niotha) gemmulatus (Lamarck, 1822)
 Nassarius (Niotha) gemmulatus var. variegatus (A. Adams, 1852)
 Nassarius (Niotha) gemmulatus var. verrucosa (A. Adams, 1852)
 Nassarius (Niotha) variegatus (A. Adams, 1852)
 Nassarius (Niotha) verrucosus (A. Adams, 1852)
 Nassarius comtessei (Iredale, 1929)
 Nassarius conoidalis conoidalis (Deshayes in Belanger, 1832)
 Nassarius gemmulatus (Lamarck, 1822)
 Niotha clathrata (Lamarck, 1816)
 Niotha clathratus (Lamarck, 1816)
 Niotha comtessei Iredale, 1929
 Niotha cumingii A. Adams, 1870
 Niotha gemmulata (Lamarck, 1822)

Description
The shell size varies between 16 mm and 32 mm

The shell has an ovate, ventricose shape. The pointed spire is composed of six or seven convex whorls.  It is ornamented upon its whole surface with granular, longitudinal folds, and transverse striae. The suture is very distinct, formed by a small canal, and bordered with closer tubercles, principally upon the body whorl. This is very much inflated, and composes almost half of the shell. The aperture is rounded. The thin outer lip is arcuated. It is folded upon the edge, ornamented internally with raised striae, which are continued within the shell. The inner lip expands upon the columella, which is truncated towards the top, and extends like a raised lip towards the base. It is covered lengthwise by two or three slightly marked, oblique folds. The interior of this shell is of a diaphanous white, like the surface, which, moreover, is covered with reddish clouds.

Distribution
This species occurs in the Red Sea, the Gulf of Oman, The Persian Gulf, in the Indian Ocean off East Africa, South Africa and Mozambique; and in the South Chinese Sea off the coast of Vietnam; off Indonesia and Australia (New South Wales, Northern Territory, Queensland, Western Australia).

References

 Deshayes, G.P. 1832. Zoologie. Mollusques. pp. 401–416 in Bélanger, M.C. (ed.). Voyage aux Indes-Orientales, par le nord de l'Europe, les provinces du Caucase, la Géorgie, l'Armenie et la Perse, suivide details topographiques, statistique et autre sur le Pégon, les Isles de Java, de Maurice et de Bourbon, sur le Cap-de-bonne-Espérance et Sainte Hélène. Paris : Arthur Bertrand Vol. 2.
 Lamarck, J.B.P.A. de M. 1816. Liste des objets représentés dans les planches de cette livraison. pp. 1–16 in Lamarck, J.B.P.A. de M. Tableau encyclopédique et méthodique des trois règnes de la nature. Vers, coquilles, mollusques et polypiers. Paris : Agasse Part 23 pp. 1–16, pls 391-488. 
 Lamarck, J.B.P.A. de M. 1822. Histoire naturelle des Animaux sans Vertèbres. Paris : J.B. Lamarck Vol. 7 711 pp. 
 Adams, A. 1852. Catalogue of the species of Nassa, a genus of Gasteropodous Mollusca, belonging to the family Buccinidae, in the Collection of Hugh Cuming, Esq., with the description of some new species. Proceedings of the Zoological Society of London 1851(19): 94-112
 Reeve, L.A. 1854. Monograph of the genus Nassa. pls 26-29 in Reeve, L.A. (ed). Conchologia Iconica. London : L. Reeve Vol. 8. 
 Martin, K. 1895. Die Fossilien von Java auf Grund einer Sammlung von Dr. R.D.M. Verbeek. Sammlung des Geologischen Reichsmuseums in Leiden 1(2): 1-132, pls 1-20
 Iredale, T. 1929. Strange molluscs in Sydney Harbour. The Australian Zoologist 5(4): 337-352, pls 37-38
 Cernohorsky W.O. (1981). Revision of the Australian and New Zealand Tertiary and Recent species of the family Nassariidae (Mollusca: Gastropoda). Records of the Auckland Institute and Museum 18:137-192.
 Cernohorsky W. O. (1984). Systematics of the Family Nassariidae (Mollusca: Gastropoda). Bulletin of the Auckland Institute and Museum 14: 1-356
 Vine, P. (1986). Red Sea Invertebrates. Immel Publishing, London. 224 pp.
 Wilson, B. 1994. Australian Marine Shells. Prosobranch Gastropods. Kallaroo, WA : Odyssey Publishing Vol. 2 370 pp. 
 Moolenbeek, R.G. 1995. Gastropods (Gastropoda). pp. 24–186 in Dance, S.P. (ed). Seashells of Eastern Arabia. Dubai : Motivate Publishing.

External links
 

Nassariidae
Gastropods described in 1832